Jiaonan was a former county and county-level city under the administration of Qingdao, Shandong province, China, located in the southwestern portion of Qingdao along the Yellow Sea coast. In 1945, as Zhushan County it was carved from Jiao County and Qingdao City, and in 1946, renamed as Jiaonan County, deriving its name from its southern location relative to Jiaozhou Bay. In 1990, it was upgraded to a county-level city. Jiaonan has 7 subdistricts and 11 towns. In December 2012, it was merged into Huangdao District.

International relations

Twin towns — sister cities 
Jiaonan is twinned with:
 Nowy Sącz, Poland

References

Cities in Shandong
History of Qingdao